Major cities in South Korea typically have several traditional markets, each with vendors selling a wide variety of goods including fruit, vegetables, meat, fish, breads, clothing, textiles, handicrafts, souvenirs, and Korean traditional medicinal items. The Korean word for market is sijang  and traditional street markets are called jaerae sijang  or jeontong sijang (. The market space commonly includes permanent restaurants, pop-up restaurants and food stalls (pojangmacha) that sell traditional Korean cuisine and street food. The Small Enterprise and Market Service (previously the Agency for Traditional Market Administration) is responsible for improving the condition of the country's traditional markets with the goal of developing them into prominent tourist attractions.

Markets in South Korea
The following is a list of retail and wholesale markets in South Korea. The list can contain many different types of markets including street markets, fish markets, farmers' markets, flea markets, and antique markets.

See also

 List of South Korean tourist attractions
 List of South Korean retail companies
 List of Korean dishes

References

External links

 Official tourist information website about South Korea's traditional markets
 Korean Culture and Information Service article on South Korea's traditional markets
 Official website of the market division of the Small Enterprise and Market Service 

Retail markets in South Korea
Markets
Markets